Chlordecone, better known in the United States under the brand name Kepone, is an organochlorine compound and a colourless solid. It is an obsolete insecticide, now prohibited in the western world, but only after many thousands of tonnes had been produced and used. Chlordecone is a known persistent organic pollutant (POP) that was banned globally by the Stockholm Convention on Persistent Organic Pollutants in 2009.

Synthesis
Chlordecone is made by dimerizing hexachlorocyclopentadiene and hydrolyzing to a ketone.

It is also the main degradation product of mirex.

History 
In the U.S., chlordecone, commercialized under the brand name "Kepone", was produced by Allied Signal Company and LifeSciences Product Company in Hopewell, Virginia. The improper handling and dumping of the substance (including the waste materials generated in its manufacturing process) into the nearby James River (U.S.) in the 1960s and 1970s drew national attention to its toxic effects on humans and wildlife.  After two physicians, Dr. Yi-nan Chou and Dr. Robert S. Jackson of the Virginia Health Department, notified the Centers for Disease Control that employees of the company had been found to have toxic chemical poisoning, LifeSciences voluntarily closed its plant on July 4, 1975, and cleanup of the contamination began and a 100-mile section of the James River was closed to fishing while state health officials looked for other persons who might have been injured.   At least 29 people in the area were hospitalized as a result of their exposure to Kepone. 

The product is made in a Diels-Alder reaction shared with pesticides like chlordane and endosulfan. Chlordecone was not federally regulated until after the Hopewell disaster, in which 29 factory workers were hospitalized with various ailments, including neurological. Chlordecone is cited amongst a handful of other noxious substances as the driver for Gerald Ford's half-hearted approval in 1976 of the Toxic Substances Control Act, which "remains one of the most controversial regulatory bills ever passed".

In 2009, chlordecone was included in the Stockholm Convention on Persistent Organic Pollutants, which bans its production and use worldwide.

Toxicology 
Chlordecone can accumulate in the liver and the distribution in the human body is regulated by binding of the pollutant or its metabolites to lipoproteins like LDL and HDL. The LC50 (LC = lethal concentration) is 35 μg/ L for Etroplus maculatus, 22–95 μg/kg for blue gill and trout. Chlordecone bioaccumulates in animals by factors up to a million-fold.

Workers with repeated exposure suffer severe convulsions resulting from degradation of the synaptic junctions.

Chronic low level exposure appears to cause prostate cancer in men, and "significant excesses of deaths were observed for stomach cancer in women and pancreatic cancer in women".

Chlordecone has been found to act as an agonist of the GPER (GPR30), which interacts strongly with the estrogen sex hormone estradiol.

Incidents
The history of chlordecone incidents are reviewed in Who's Poisoning America?: Corporate Polluters and Their Victims in the Chemical Age (1982).

James River estuary 
In July 1975, Virginia Governor Mills Godwin Jr. shut down the James River to fishing for 100 miles, from Richmond to the Chesapeake Bay. This ban remained in effect for 13 years, until efforts to clean up the river began to show results.

Due to the pollution risks, many fishermen, marinas, seafood businesses, and restaurants, along with their employees along the river suffered economic losses. In 1981, a large group of these entities sued Allied Chemical in federal district court (Eastern District of Virginia), claiming special economic damages from Allied's negligent damage to the fish and wildlife. In a case that sometimes appears in law school courses on Remedies, the court rejected the traditional "economic-loss rule", which requires physical impact causing personal injury or property damage to receive economic damages, and instead allowed a limited group of the plaintiffs—the fishing boat owners, the marinas, and the bait and tackle shops—to recover economic damages from Allied Chemical.

French Antilles 
The French islands of Martinique and Guadeloupe are heavily contaminated with chlordecone, following years of its massive and unrestricted use on banana plantations. Despite a 1990 ban on the substance in mainland France, the economically powerful banana planters lobbied intensively to obtain a waiver to keep using Kepone until 1993. They argued that no alternative pesticide was available, which has since been disputed. After the 1993 ban, the banana planters were discreetly granted derogations to use their remaining stocks, and a 2005 report prepared by the French National Assembly states that the chemical, under the name Curlone, most likely continued to be illegally imported and was used for many more years. Since 2003, local authorities in the two islands have restricted cultivation of many food crops because the soil is badly contaminated by chlordecone. A 2018 large-scale study by the French public health agency, Santé publique France, shows that 95% of the inhabitants of Guadeloupe and 92% of those of Martinique are contaminated by the chemical. Guadeloupe has one of the highest prostate cancer diagnosis rates in the world.

In popular culture 
 Kepone was the name of an American indie rock band from Richmond, Virginia formed in 1991.
 The Dead Kennedys recorded a song named "Kepone Factory", a satire of the controversy surrounding Allied Signal and their negligence regarding employee safety, for their 1981 album In God We Trust, Inc..

References

External links
Terradaily: Pesticide blamed for 'health disaster' in French Caribbean
EPA releases a Toxicological Review of Kepone (External Review Draft) for public comment – 01/2008
CDC – NIOSH Pocket Guide to Chemical Hazards

Obsolete pesticides
Carcinogens
GPER agonists
Ketones
Organochloride insecticides
James River (Virginia)
Endocrine disruptors
IARC Group 2B carcinogens
Persistent organic pollutants under the Stockholm Convention
Male reproductive toxicants
Persistent organic pollutants under the Convention on Long-Range Transboundary Air Pollution
Xenoestrogens
Cyclobutanes
1975 disasters in the United States
1975 in the environment
Neurotoxins
Presidency of Gerald Ford